Dipsinh Shankarsinh Rathod is an Indian politician and a member of parliament to the 16th Lok Sabha from Sabarkantha, Gujarat. He won the 2014 Indian general election being a Bharatiya Janata Party candidate.

References

India MPs 2014–2019
Lok Sabha members from Gujarat
Bharatiya Janata Party politicians from Gujarat
People from Sabarkantha district
Living people
1952 births
India MPs 2019–present